The Rev. John Hugh O'Donnell, C.S.C. (June 2, 1884 – June 12, 1947) was an American priest and President of the University of Notre Dame from 1940 to 1946, after having served has Vice President from 1934 to 1940.

President of the University of Notre Dame
During World War II, O'Donnell offered Notre Dame's facilities to the armed forces. The navy accepted his offer and installed Naval ROTC units on campus as part of the V-12 Navy College Training Program. Soon after the installation there were only a few hundred civilian students at Notre Dame. O'Donnell also continued O'Hara's work with the graduate school. He further formalized the graduate program and replaced the previous committee of graduate studies with a dean.

References

External links 
 http://archives.nd.edu/hope/hope32.htm
 http://archives.nd.edu/findaids/ead/xml/voc.xml

Presidents of the University of Notre Dame
20th-century American Roman Catholic priests
Congregation of Holy Cross
1884 births
1947 deaths
20th-century American academics